The Oregon Coast Trail (OCT) is a long-distance hiking route along the Pacific coast of the U.S. state of Oregon in the United States. It follows the coast of Oregon from the mouth of the Columbia River to the California border south of Brookings.

The trail was envisioned in 1959 by Samuel N. Dicken, a University of Oregon geography professor, approved in 1971 by the Oregon Recreation Trails Advisory Council and developed and managed by the Oregon Parks and Recreation Department as part of the state park system of Oregon. About 39 percent of the route is on the beach, 41 percent is on paved road, and 20 percent is on trail and dirt roads. Private ferries can however be arranged at some estuaries to shortcut road segments. Walked in its entirety, linking each trail/beach section, the distance is approximately 425 miles.

A chief feature of the trail are the public beaches created in 1967 via the Oregon Beach Bill, which formalized the public nature of the coastal beaches since the first such law was passed in 1913.  Many of the locations, particularly on the southern portion, are remote and isolated.  The Oregon coast is bordered by a temperate rainforest, much of which is now second or third growth.

The difficulty of the trail ranges from easy to moderate, with elevation changes of up to a few hundred feet.

Route 

The northern trailhead is at the base of the south jetty of the Columbia River, approximately 4 miles (6 km) north of the campground of Fort Stevens State Park and about 13 miles (21 km) from the city of Astoria. The trail runs north-south along the entire Oregon Coast, following the shore as closely as practical. For many portions of the route, it is beach walking, mostly on sand. In populated areas it often follows the nearest street to the shore. Many parts of the trail leave the beach and take an inland path, usually where land formations make the shoreline impassable, such as at Cape Kiwanda. Some of the rocky headlands are passable on foot at beach level only at low tide. Other headlands are traversed by state park or forest service trails well above the sea. In many other places, the road is the only feasible route, mostly U.S. Route 101.

Besides headlands, there are numerous rivers and creeks which must be crossed.  Most creeks are forded by wading, although sometimes the water can be waist deep even at low tide.  At high tide, some are hazardous or impossible to cross and require a boat or a detour to a bridge.  Rainfall during winter and early spring decreases the number of streams which are safely fordable.

Trail-walking information 
The Oregon Coast Trail (OCT) is a described route and not a continuous trail. Thirty-nine percent of the route is on beaches. Twenty percent follows trails. If walked in its entirety (without taking ferries), the total distance is approximately 425 miles. The OCT is signed throughout its length, but in some places signage is not reliable. However it is difficult to become lost since the route is never more than a few miles from a paved road. In 2009, the State of Oregon posted a set of downloadable maps with brief route descriptions. 

A dedicated guidebook for the OCT was published in 2015, called Exploring the Oregon Coast Trail. Written by Connie Soper, the book details 40 consecutive day hikes, and also includes maps and logistical information for the entire Oregon Coast Trail, such as tidal considerations and arranging for boat rides. The trail is open to hikers, and in some places, to bicycles, and equestrians (but not the entire route). As portions of the route lead around headlands or cross river mouths that are only passable at low tide, carrying a current tide table and relevant topographic information can be extremely helpful. Sometimes a hiker must choose between waiting for a lower tide or walking inland to avoid high water.

Seasonal recreation restrictions are in place from March 15 through September 15 in some locations to protect shorebird nesting. These restrictions include complete prohibition of dogs, camping, non-motorized vehicles (including bicycles and fat bikes), motorized vehicles, and kites. Hikers and equestrians must also stay on the wet sand. Shorebird areas are clearly marked on the beach with yellow signs.

Many state campgrounds have areas dedicated for hikers and bicyclists at reduced prices (compared to vehicles). Beach camping is allowed where out of sight of residences, not adjacent to state parks, and not near snowy plover during nesting season. This limits camping on some areas of the trail to developed campgrounds, particularly along the northern beaches. Oregon Parks Forever funded the creation and installation of nine Hiker/Biker pods for tent campers in state parks along the coast: They are located in hiker/biker camps at Fort Stevens, Devil’s Lake, Cape Blanco, Harris Beach, Cape Lookout, Bullards Beach, Nehalem Bay, Beverly Beach, Honeyman, and Sunset Bay. The State of Oregon has stated its intention to create more primitive and free camping areas. 

Vehicles are allowed on a few beaches.  Dune buggies are used extensively in the Oregon Dunes National Recreation Area, a  stretch of beach from Florence to Coos Bay.

Several portions of the trail are pristine and secluded, such as the segment from Bandon to Port Orford, where several days of relative solitude and free camping exist.

Prevailing winds are from the northwest which makes the trail easier to hike from north to south. Route descriptions are also written assuming a north to south direction of travel.

Cities and towns of various sizes are located along Highway 101 every  permitting re-provisioning on a regular basis.  Public transportation is extremely limited along the coast.

Points of interest 

Places found along the OCT from north to south.
Fort Stevens State Park
Gearhart, at the mouth of the Necanicum River
Seaside
Tillamook Head
Ecola State Park
Cannon Beach
Oswald West State Park
Manzanita
Nehalem and Nehalem Bay State Park
Garibaldi
Tillamook Bay
Tillamook
Cape Meares State Park
Oceanside
Netarts
Cape Lookout and Cape Lookout State Park
Neskowin
Lincoln City
Depoe Bay
Devils Punch Bowl State Natural Area
Beverly Beach State Park
Newport
South Beach State Park
Ona Beach State Park
Seal Rock State Recreation Site
Waldport
Yachats
Neptune State Scenic Viewpoint
Carl G. Washburne Memorial State Park
Heceta Head Light
Jessie M. Honeyman Memorial State Park
Oregon Dunes National Recreation Area
Reedsport
Umpqua Lighthouse State Park
Coos Bay
Bullards Beach State Park
BLM primitive campground, at the New River ACEC
Boice Cope Park, a Curry County campground at Floras Lake
Cape Blanco and Cape Blanco State Park
Humbug Mountain State Park
Gold Beach and Rogue River (Oregon)
Samuel Boardman State Park
Harris Beach State Park
Natural Bridges Viewpoint, near Brookings
Brookings
Winchuck River

See also 
 List of lighthouses on the Oregon Coast
 California Coastal Trail

References

External links 
 Official Website – Oregon State Parks, with maps
 Archive of Henderson OCT page Descriptive trail guide.
Oregon Coast Trail Foundation Explore by Section trail guide.

Parks in Clatsop County, Oregon
Parks in Coos County, Oregon
Parks in Curry County, Oregon
Parks in Douglas County, Oregon
Parks in Lane County, Oregon
Parks in Lincoln County, Oregon
Parks in Tillamook County, Oregon
State parks of Oregon
Oregon Coast
Hiking trails in Oregon
Long-distance trails in the United States